Delta Phi Epsilon ( or DPhiE) is an international sorority founded on March 17, 1917 at New York University Law School in Manhattan. It is one of 26 social sororities that form the National Panhellenic Conference. It has 110 active chapters, three of which are located in Canada, making the sorority an international organization.

History 
On March 17, 1917, at the New York University School of Law, then known as Washington Square College Law, five women founded the Delta Phi Epsilon Sorority: Dorothy Cohen Schwartzman, Ida Bienstock Landau, Minna Goldsmith Mahler, Eva Effron Robin, and Sylvia Steierman Cohn. A factor in founding the sorority was to create one accepting of all races and religions, and they were the first non-sectarian social sorority to do so. These five women, collectively called the DIMES by the Sorority as an abbreviation of their first names, wanted to "promote good fellowship among the women students among the various colleges in the country...to create a secret society composed of these women based upon their good moral character, regardless of nationality or creed...to have distinct chapters at various colleges".

Five years later, in 1922, Delta Phi Epsilon was officially incorporated under the state laws of New York and that same year became an international sorority by placing its Epsilon chapter at McGill University in Canada. As of 2021 there are more than 67,000 members of Delta Phi Epsilon.

Philanthropies 
Delta Phi Epsilon is partnered with several international philanthropies via its Delta Phi Epsilon Educational Foundation: the Cystic Fibrosis Foundation and the National Association of Anorexia Nervosa and Associated Disorders.

The Delta Phi Epsilon Educational Foundation, established in 1966 to honor Delta Phi Epsilon's Golden Anniversary, helps members and their children further their education through scholarships, grants, and loans. The foundation also supports sorority education and volunteer training initiatives.

The Cystic Fibrosis Foundation aids those with the genetic disease cystic fibrosis (CF) through research, grants, and awareness campaigns. Founded by Phyllis Kossoff, a member of the sorority's Delta chapter at Hunter College, and other concerned parents, the Cystic Fibrosis Foundation became the leader in raising funding for research and raising awareness for the disease. At the sorority's December 1957 Convention, Phyllis petitioned her sisters to have the sorority adopt CFF as its official philanthropy. Chapters across North America raise money and awareness. Many chapters host a fundraising event known as Deepher Dude which is a male dance competition. Some chapters fill tote bags, called Tate's Totes, with various items that make an extended hospital stay more comfortable for children with cystic fibrosis and their parents. These totes are then taken to Cystic Fibrosis Foundation (CFF) Care Centers for distribution. Tate's Totes was started by past International President Donna Von Bruening (Sigma chapter at Ohio State University) shortly after taking office, after her nephew Tate had been diagnosed with cystic fibrosis. Other chapters host 65 Roses Gala events. Sixty-five roses is significant to CF children since the word "cystic fibrosis" is difficult for a child to say. Since 1957, Delta Phi Epsilon has raised millions of dollars for CFF. At the 2016 International Leadership Forum, Delta Phi Epsilon Sorority gave their largest single donation to date of $471,060.

The sorority's other philanthropic partner is the National Association of Anorexia Nervosa and Associated Disorders, which provides resources and education to fight anorexia and other eating disorders. Each chapter sponsors an annual eating disorder awareness week on their campus to increase awareness of eating disorders and provide information to family and friends of sufferers.

Membership 
As with all National Panhellenic Conference (NPC) sororities, women may join Delta Phi Epsilon if they attend as an undergraduate a university with an active chapter from which they receive a membership offer. Before graduation, the sorority's programming focuses on five areas: sisterhood, scholarship, self, service, and social. Members of the sorority must follow the three core values: Justice, sisterhood, and love. After graduation, the programming for alumnae moves to five other areas: character, civic, cultural, connection, career.

Symbols 
Delta Phi Epsilon's flower is the Lovely Purple Iris, and its international mascot is the Unicorn. The sisterhood badge is an equilateral triangle in gold surrounded by 21 pearls, the jewel of the sorority. DPhiE's open motto is "Esse Quam Videri" (in Latin: "To be rather than to seem to be"). The hold great value in the foudning principles of justice, sisterhood, and love.

Policy on trans and non-binary inclusion 
The sorority's Committee on Trans and Gender Non-Binary Inclusion developed a policy, in 2017, Inclusive of trans women and non-binary individuals for membership. This policy was subsequently adopted by the organization's International Governing Board."This policy reflects Delta Phi Epsilon International Sorority’s commitment to anti-discrimination practices in relation to all trans women and non-binary individuals [potential new members, sisters (active and alumnae), volunteers, and staff] and ensures their rights to express themselves and live authentically are respected and protected.

The purpose of this policy is to establish an environment that is safe, welcoming, and free from stigma and discrimination for all potential new members, sisters, volunteer, and staff, regardless of sex, sexual orientation, gender identity, or gender expression."Alongside an outline for recruitment, the policy also outlines definitions and guidelines for active chapters to uphold respect for trans and non-binary individuals.

Notable alumnae 
 Stephanie Abrams (Delta Kappa) – Meteorologist for The Weather Channel
 Barbara Aronstein Black (Phi) – First woman to head an Ivy League law school
 Barbara Boxer (Phi) – U.S. Senator, California
 Susan Davis (Delta Zeta) – U.S. Representative, 53rd District, California
 Lee Ducat (Nu) – Founder of the Juvenile Diabetes Foundation
 Jackie Goldberg (Delta Zeta) – California State Assembly, 45th District
 Judith Heumann (Upsilon) – Former Assistant Secretary Office of Special Education & Rehabilitation Services, US Department of Education (Clinton Administration), Disability Rights Activist
 Ofira Navon (Psi) – Former First Lady of Israel
 Judith Rodin (Nu) – First female president of an Ivy League university
 Jan Schakowsky (Rho) – U.S. Congresswoman, 9th District, Illinois
 Susan Polis Schutz (Delta Sigma) – Poet, Creator of Blue Mountain greeting cards
 Aimee Boorman, Head coach of the United States Women's Gymnastics team at the 2016 summer olympics
 Meredith Eaton – Actor who stars in multiple CBS shows including NCIS, NCIS New Orleans and Macgyver

Active chapters 
These are the current active chapters of Delta Phi Epsilon:

See also 
 Pi Sigma Psi, former chapter at Dartmouth College
 List of social fraternities and sororities
 List of Jewish fraternities and sororities

References

External links 
 Delta Phi Epsilon Website
 Delta Phi Epsilon Educational Foundation

1917 establishments in New York (state)
National Panhellenic Conference
Student societies in the United States
Student organizations established in 1917
Historically Jewish sororities in the United States